For You is the first album by Australian Idol series two winner Casey Donovan, produced by Bryon Jones and released on 13 December 2004 by Sony BMG.The album debuted at number two on the Australian ARIA Albums Chart. The album included the number one single "Listen with Your Heart".

Track listing

Notes
 The Itunes version replaces track 11 from "Symphony of Life" (live from Australian Idol) with "Flow" (single edit).

Charts
For You debuted on the Australian ARIA Albums Chart at number two on 20 December 2004 with sales of 34,036 copies. It was kept off the top spot by Robbie Williams' album Greatest Hits

Weekly charts

Year-end charts

Certifications

References 

2004 debut albums
Sony BMG albums
Casey Donovan (singer) albums